The 2016–17 season was the 60th season in RK Zamet’s history. It is their 9th successive season in the Dukat Premier League, and 39th successive top tier season.

First team squad
Source: eurohandball.com

Goalkeeper
 1  Marin Đurica
 12  Fran Lučin
 16  Marin Sorić

Wingers
RW
 5  Patrik Martinović
 11  Filip Glavaš
LW
 2  Dario Jeličić
 4  Mateo Hrvatin (vice-captain)
 20  Noa Tubić

Line players
 6  David Šunjić 
 7  Milan Uzelac (captain)
 8  Tin Lučin
 10  Jadranko Stojanović
 19  Ivan Majić

Back players
LB
 21  Veron Načinović
CB 
 14  Matija Golik
 17  Raul Valković
 22  Marko Mrakovčić
 23  Paulo Grozdek

RB
 9  Matija Starčević
 15  Marin Kružić

Loans
  Dario Pešić (to RK Kozala)

Left during season
LW
 Viktor Stipčić

LB
 David Miličević
 Petar Jelušić

Technical staff
  President: Vedran Devčić
  Sports director: Vedran Babić
  Head Coach: Marin Mišković (until March 3)
  Head Coach: Igor Marijanović (from March 3)
  Assistant Coach: Valter Matošević (until March 3)
  Assistant Coach: Vedran Babić (from March 3)
  Goalkeeper Coach: Valter Matošević (until March 3)
  Fitness Coach: Dragan Marijanović
  Tehniko: Williams Černeka

Competitions

Overall

Last updated: 3 June 2017.

EHF Cup

Qualification stage

Updated to match(es) played on 26 November 2016. Source: eurohandball.com

Dukat Premier League

League table

Updated to match(es) played on 2 April 2017. Source: Premier league Reultati.com

Matches

Updated to match(es) played on 1 April 2017. Source: Premier league SportCom.hr

Relegation play-offs table

League table

This table contains statistics combined with the regular part of the Dukat Premier League. Source:  SportCom.hr

Matches

Updated to match(es) played on 3 June 2017. Source:  SportCom.hr

Croatian Cup

Matches

Updated to match(es) played on 5 March 2017. Source: sportcom.hr

Friendly matches

Pre-season

Updated to match(es) played on 5 March 2017. Source: sportcom.hr

Memorial Zvonimir Škerl

Updated to match(es) played on 5 March 2017. Source: sportcom.hr

Mid-season

Updated to match(es) played on 5 March 2017. Source: sportcom.hr

Premier League statistics

Shooting

Updated to match(es) played on 4 June 2017. Source: Premier league Rukometstat.com

Goalkeepers

Updated to match(es) played on 1 April 2017. Source: Premier league Rukometstat.com

Top goalscorers

Updated to match(es) played on 1 April 2017. Source: Premier league Rukometstat.com

7m

Updated to match(es) played on 1 April 2017. Source: Premier league Rukometstat.com

Assists

Updated to match(es) played on 1 April 2017. Source: Premier league Rukometstat.com

Punishment drawn

Updated to match(es) played on 1 April 2017. Source: Premier league Rukometstat.com

2m punishments

Updated to match(es) played on 1 April 2017. Source: Premier league Rukometstat.com

Yellow cards - Premier League

Updated to match(es) played on 1 April 2017. Source: Premier league Rukometstat.com

Red cards

Updated to match(es) played on 26 March 2017. Source: Premier league Rukometstat.com

Croatian Cup statistics

Updated to match(es) played on 5 March 2017. Source: SportCom.hr

EHF Cup statistics

Shooting

Updated to match(es) played on 10 February 2017. Source: Stats

Goalkeepers

Updated to match(es) played on 10 February 2017. Source: eurohandball.com

Transfers

In

Out

Source: Hrsport.net

Sources
Hrs.hr
Rk-zamet.hr
SportCom.hr
Sport.net.hr
Rezultati.com

References

RK Zamet seasons